Scar is a fictional character and the main antagonist in Disney's The Lion King franchise. He was created by screenwriters Irene Mecchi, Jonathan Roberts, and Linda Woolverton, and animated by Andreas Deja. Scar is introduced in the first film as the ruthless, power-hungry younger brother of Mufasa, ruler of the Pride Lands. Originally first-in-line to Mufasa's throne until he is suddenly replaced by Mufasa's son Simba, Scar decides to lead an army of hyenas in his plot to take the throne by killing Mufasa and exiling Simba, ultimately blaming his brother's death on his nephew.

Loosely based on King Claudius, the main antagonist of William Shakespeare's Hamlet, Scar's villainy was additionally inspired by Adolf Hitler. As the character's supervising animator, Deja based Scar's appearance on that of original voice actor Jeremy Irons, as well as the actor's performance as Claus von Bülow in Reversal of Fortune. Chiwetel Ejiofor voices the photorealistic version of the character in the CGI remake of the 1994 film with Kelvin Harrison Jr. voicing him in follow-up film.

As a character, Scar has garnered widespread acclaim from film critics, who greeted Irons' vocal performance with equal enthusiasm. However, Scar's violence, dark color palette and allegedly effeminate mannerisms were initially met with mild controversy. Nevertheless, Scar continues to be revered as one of Disney's greatest villains by various media publications, topping The Huffington Post’s list and ranking within the top ten of similar lists published by Yahoo! Movies, the Orlando Sentinel, E! and CNN. He has also been ranked among the greatest villains in film history by Digital Spy and Entertainment Weekly.

Development

Conception and influences
The Lion King was first conceived in 1988. The film was eventually pitched to Disney executives, one of whom was among the first to observe similarities between author Thomas M. Disch's treatment and William Shakespeare's play Hamlet. Although first citing these similarities as initially unintentional, director Rob Minkoff always felt it was essential "to anchor [the film] with something familiar." As directors, Minkoff and Roger Allers aspired to create "an animal picture based in a more natural setting," describing the film as "More true-life adventure than mythical epic." Although not the first Disney film to have been inspired by Shakespeare's work, The Lion King remains the studio's most prominent example due to close parallels between its characters and Hamlet, while both stories revolve around main characters who struggle to come to terms with the reality that they must confront their treacherous uncles and avenge their fathers' deaths. Scar is based on King Claudius. According to Slate, while Claudius is mostly "a second-rate schemer ... consumed by anxiety and guilt," Scar very much "delight[s] in his monstrosity;" both characters are motivated by jealousy. Meanwhile, The Week observed that although both characters ultimately die, Claudius is killed by protagonist Hamlet while Scar dies "at the hand of his former hyena minions, and not Simba himself." Additionally, the character shares similarities with Iago from Shakespeare's play Othello; both antagonists are skilled in exploiting their victims' fears.

The original plot of The Lion King revolved around a rivalry between lions and baboons. A baboon himself, Scar was their leader. After this plot was abandoned, Scar was re-written into a rogue lion lacking any blood relation to both Mufasa and Simba. The writers eventually decided that making Scar and Mufasa brothers would make the film more interesting. At one point Scar owned a pet python as a sidekick, but this character was abandoned. Because the film was originally intended to be much more adult-oriented, Scar was to have become infatuated with Simba's childhood friend and eventual love interest Nala, wanting the young lioness to rule alongside him as his queen and consequentially banishing the character when she refuses. This concept was to have been further explored during a reprise of Scar's song "Be Prepared", but both the idea and the song were ultimately completely removed from the film because they were deemed too "creepy".  In addition to that, there was a scene in which Scar was originally going to defeat Simba, and throw him off Pride Rock, before they are both engulfed by flames. This ending was cut for being far too dark for young viewers. To further emphasize the character's villainy and tyranny, the writers loosely based Scar on Adolf Hitler. According to The Jerusalem Post, Scar's song "Be Prepared" "features goose-stepping hyenas in a formation reminiscent of a Nuremberg rally." This idea was first suggested by story artist Jorgen Klubien.

According to the directors, "[a] patronizing quality" was vital to Scar's role in the film. Minkoff told the Los Angeles Times, "When Scar puts the guilt trip on Simba, that's an intense idea ... probably something that is not typical of the other Disney pictures, in terms of what the villain does." Additionally, Scar serves as a departure from previous Disney villains because they "came off at least as buffoonish as they were sinister". Because Scar is the film's main antagonist, supervising animator Andreas Deja believed that "villains work really well when they're subtle", explaining, "to see them think and scheme and plot is much more interesting than showing them beating somebody up." By blaming Mufasa's death on an innocent Simba, Scar ultimately triggers "a cycle of guilt, flight, denial and redemption, as the hero goes into self-imposed exile before finally reconciling with his father's memory, returning to face his wicked uncle and generally coming of age." The character's first line in The Lion King "essentially summarizes the entire film, providing foreshadowing". It reads, "Life's not fair is it? You see I—well, I ... shall never be King. And you ... shall never see light of another day .(chuckles) Adieu." subtly revealing the plot as well as "the reason why [Scar] decides to murder his own brother." (This line is given minor edits for the 2019 remake: "Life's ... not fair. ... Is it, my little friend? While some are born to feast, others spend their lives in the dark ... begging for scraps. The way I see it, ... you and I are exactly the same: ... we both want to find a way out.")

Voice

1994 incarnation 
Tim Curry, Malcolm McDowell, Alan Rickman, Patrick Stewart, and Ian McKellen were all originally considered for the role of Scar. However, the role was ultimately won by British actor Jeremy Irons because of his classical theater training; the directors had deliberately wanted Scar "to come across as a Shakespearean character." Successfully recruiting Irons for the film was considered an unprecedented achievement for the studio because, at the time, it was rare for a dramatic actor of Irons' caliber to agree to voice an animated character, especially immediately after winning an Academy Award. In fact, the Oscar-winning actor nearly declined because, in fear of jeopardizing his successful career, he was "[h]esitant to jump from a dramatic role to an animated feature." Prior to The Lion King, Irons was famous for starring as several villains and antagonists in live-action films "geared towards adults." Although he had starred in a children's film before, the actor admitted that it did not mirror the success of The Lion King, a film that has since gained notoriety for its cast of well known, award-winning Hollywood actors, which animation historian Jerry Beck referred to in his book The Animated Movie Guide as "the most impressive list of actors ever to grace an animated film."

As directors, Minkoff and Allers "work[ed] very closely with the actors to create their performance." Describing Irons as "a gentleman and a brilliant actor," Allers revealed that the actor was constantly offering "extra interpretations of lines which were fantastic." Producer Don Hahn recalled that Irons "really wanted to play with the words and the pacing," specifically referring to a scene in which Scar coaxes Simba onto a rock and tricks the young cub to stay there and await his father's arrival alone, dubbing it "a father and son ... thing." According to Hahn, "The comedy in [Irons's] inflection comes from Scar sounding so disdainful he can barely summon the will to finish the sentence." Irons's physical appearance and mannerisms served as inspiration for Scar's supervising animator Andreas Deja, namely his flicking his paw in disgust. Critics have cited physical similarities between Irons and Scar.

In a reference to the role that earned Irons an Academy Award, Claus von Bülow in Reversal of Fortune (1990), the writers gave Scar one of von Bülow's lines, "You have no idea," which is uttered by Irons in a similar tone. According to author Rachel Stein of New Perspectives on Environmental Justice: Gender, Sexuality, and Activism, Irons relies "on his history of playing sexually perverse, socially dangerous male characters to animate his depiction of Scar." On the contrary, Irons revealed to Connect Savannah that the similarities between the voices of Scar and von Bülow were largely unintentional, explaining, "Whatever voice came was arrived at by looking at the initial sketches, and from the freedom the directors gave me to try anything." Irons concluded, "The fact that he may occasionally remind you of Claus, comes from the fact that they both share the same voice box."

While recording Scar's song, "Be Prepared," Irons encountered challenges with his singing voice. The actor reportedly "blew out his voice" upon belting the line "you won't get a sniff without me," rendering him incapable of completing the musical number. Consequently, Disney was forced to recruit American voice actor Jim Cummings, who had also been providing the voice of The Lion Kings laughing hyena Ed at the time, to impersonate Irons and record the rest of the song. Jim Cummings told The Huffington Post that "[s]tunt singing" is actually something the actor continues to do regularly, having done the same for American actor Russell Means, voice of Chief Powhatan in Disney's Pocahontas (1995). Critics observed that Irons "fakes his way ... through 'Be Prepared' in the grand tradition of talk-singing," drawing similarities between him and American actor James Cagney and English actor Rex Harrison. Deja revealed that, during a recording session, Irons' stomach was grumbling. Deja joked, "The growling sound could be heard in his recording, so we had to record that part of his dialog all over again." As a result of Irons' prominent British accent, critics have compared both the actor and Scar to Shere Khan, the villain of Disney's The Jungle Book (1967), voiced by English actor George Sanders.

2019 incarnation 
Chiwetel Ejiofor was officially chosen on November 1, 2017 for the role of Scar in the CGI live action remake, The Lion King (2019) directed by Jon Favreau, as he had impressed Favreau after watching his antagonistic performance as Baron Mordo in the Marvel film Doctor Strange (2016). Ejiofor said that "especially with Scar, whether it's a vocal quality that allows for a certain confidence or a certain aggression, to always know that at the end of it you’re playing somebody who has the capacity to turn everything on its head in a split second with outrageous acts of violence – that can completely change the temperature of a scene". Favreau said of casting Ejiofor, "[He] is just a fantastic actor, who brings us a bit of the mid-Atlantic cadence and a new take on the character. He brings that feeling of a Shakespearean villain to bear because of his background as an actor. It's wonderful when you have somebody as experienced and seasoned as Chiwetel; he just breathes such wonderful life into this character." When Jeremy Irons was interviewed on Larry King Now on November 30, 2016, he expressed interest in reprising the role.

In August 2021, it was announced that Kelvin Harrison Jr. would voice Young Scar in Barry Jenkins' follow-up to the 2019 film.

Design and characterization 
The studio originally dismissed The Lion King as a risk because, at the time, it was believed that the greatest films starred people. Concerned about the novelty of the film, Disney chairman Jeffrey Katzenberg decided to divide the studio into two separate animated films, The Lion King and Pocahontas, the latter of which was dubbed "the home run" because it was expected to be the more successful of the two projects. Disney's more seasoned and experienced animators gravitated towards Pocahontas, while the studio's newer animators were relegated to working on The Lion King, dubbing themselves the "B-team". However, Allers received Katzenberg's decision positively as an opportunity for "newer animators ... to step up to leadership roles", among them Andreas Deja, who became Scar's supervising animator. Well known for animating several Disney villains, Deja summarized the experience as "more fun than drawing heroes" because "You have so much more to work with in terms of expressions and acting and drawing-wise than you would have with a nice princess or a prince ... where you have to be ever so careful with the draftsmanship."

Before becoming involved with The Lion King, Deja had already developed a reputation for animating Disney villains. Prior to animating Scar, Deja had just recently served as the supervising animator of Gaston and Jafar, the villains in Disney's Beauty and the Beast (1991) and Aladdin (1992), respectively. Initially, Deja had been considering the idea of animating a hero as opposed to a villain for a change, contemplating taking on the task of animating Simba instead. However, Deja soon relented upon learning that Scar would be voiced by Irons, feeling that it would be "fun" to animate a character voiced by such a prestigious actor. Meanwhile, Minkoff and Allers had already had Deja in mind for animating Scar long before the animator approached the directors about the position. The level anthropomorphism used in The Lion King exceeded that of any Disney animated film by which it was preceded. Because Scar is an animal as opposed to a human, Deja and the animators experienced certain challenges and limitations when it came to instilling movement in the character, and thus experimented with manipulating Scar's facial expressions, specifically the way in which he tilts his head condescendingly, raises his eyebrows and lifts his chin. The animals were each drawn with certain human-like attributes and characteristics in order to help convey emotions and tell the story. Meanwhile, the studio recruited live lions for the animators to study while drawing. As the film's villain, Scar is the only lion drawn with claws.

Owen Gleiberman of Entertainment Weekly described Scar as "a figure of both pity and evil, and of treacherous comedy" with "Irons ... filling this devious coward with elegantly witty self-loathing." As an animator, Deja believes that "If you have a great voice to work with, your work is half done." Enjoying the way in which Irons "has a way with words and phrasing," Deja deliberately based much of Scar's appearance on the actor himself, specifically the shape of his mouth and facial expressions. Several of the actor's physical attributes were incorporated into Scar's design, with Irons admitting to recognizing his own baggy eyes in his character. Additionally, Deja studied Irons' performances in the films Reversal of Fortune (1990) and Damage (1992) for inspiration, while refusing to watch Disney's The Jungle Book while working on The Lion King in order to avoid being influenced by the film's villain – Shere Khan, a tiger.

Music 
Scar sings the musical number "Be Prepared," written by songwriters Elton John and Tim Rice, while contemplating Mufasa's death plot and bringing the hyenas along. Described as the film's "darkest" song, a "pompous," "fascistic paean to usurpers," the musical sequence depicts the lion "as a big-cat fascist." According to Business Insider, in addition to loosely basing the character on Adolf Hitler to further emphasize Scar's tyranny, the filmmakers very much directly based his song "Be Prepared," which references Nazism by having Scar's army of hyenas goose step while addressing them from a high ledge – similar to the way in which Hitler would have from a balcony – in the Nazi propaganda film Triumph of the Will (1935), a film that documents Nazi Germany during 1934.

According to Entertainment Weekly, the concept originated from a sketch by story artist Jorgen Klubien, in which Scar was depicted as Hitler. Although hesitant that then-Disney Animation chief Jeffrey Katzenberg would approve, the filmmakers ultimately decided to pursue it, describing the sequence as a "Triumph of the Will-style mock-Nuremberg rally." The St. Louis Post-Dispatch reviewed, "those goose-stepping hyenas seem a little much in hindsight," while Film School Rejects coined it a "hellish gathering."

Appearances

Animated films

The Lion King (1994) 
Scar debuted in The Lion King (1994). The scheming younger brother of Mufasa, Scar was next-in-line to take the throne until his nephew Simba, Mufasa's son, was born, replacing him. Determined to seize the throne, Scar devises a plan to kill both Simba and Mufasa. After trapping Simba in a vast gorge, Scar signals his hyena minions, Shenzi, Banzai and Ed, to trigger a wildebeest stampede. Although Mufasa saves Simba, the king is weakened, and unable to climb out of the gorge to safety. When Mufasa begs Scar for help, Scar instead digs his claws into his brother’s. At that moment, Mufasa realizes too little too late that he is responsible for the stampede and the last thing he hears is him menacingly saying “long live the king!” before sending him to his death below. Convincing Simba that he is to blame for Mufasa's death, Scar advises the prince to run away and never return, then orders the hyenas to kill him. Scar returns to Pride Rock and tells the pride that both Mufasa and Simba died in the stampede before becoming king and allowing the hyenas into the Pride Lands. Unbeknownst to Scar, Simba was able to escape the hyenas.

Years go by as Scar squanders the kingdom's resources and allows his army of hyenas to wreak havoc upon the Pride Lands, which turn barren. In addition, he forbids anyone from mentioning Mufasa’s name in his presence (mainly to try and get out of his shadow). Meanwhile, aided by his friends Nala, Timon and Pumbaa, an adult Simba returns to Pride Rock and witnesses Scar striking his mother Sarabi and confronts his uncle, who then demands that Simba admit to the pride that he killed Mufasa. As he prepares to throw Simba off Pride Rock, Scar whispers to Simba that he was the one who killed Mufasa, confident that the secret will die with him. However, this angers Simba, who leaps up and tackles Scar to the ground and forces his uncle to admit his action to the pride, initiating a battle between the pride and Scar's hyenas. Scar tries to escape, but is cornered by Simba on the top of Pride Rock; Scar begs for mercy and even attempts to blame his doings on the hyenas, unaware that they are listening nearby. Simba spares Scar on the condition that Scar permanently departs. Scar briefly pretends to do so, but then attacks Simba and they fight. Scar knocks Simba on his back, but as he lunges to deliver the killing blow, Simba kicks Scar over the cliff ledge to the base of Pride Rock. Scar survives but is cornered by the vengeful hyenas, who eat him alive for betraying them, ending his threat to Simba and his family for good.

The Lion King II: Simba's Pride
Due to his death in The Lion King, Scar's appearance and presence in its sequel The Lion King II: Simba's Pride (1998) is limited. Upon (and despite) Scar's demise, a rivaling pride of lions known as the Outsiders decide to remain loyal to him, led by his most devoted follower, Zira. Zira's son Kovu is chosen to serve as Scar's heir. Simba banishes the Outsiders to the Outlands, and forbids his daughter Kiara from going there. She goes there anyway, however, and meets and befriends Kovu. Meanwhile, Zira trains Kovu to murder Simba, but when he becomes an adult, he has a change of heart as he begins to develop feelings for Kiara.

Scar makes a brief cameo appearance in the film during Simba's nightmare. In the nightmare, Simba runs down the cliff where his father died in the stampede, attempting to rescue him. Scar appears, however, and then turns into Kovu and throws Simba off the cliff. Scar makes another cameo appearance in a pool of water, as a reflection, after Kovu is exiled from the Pridelands.

The Lion King 1 1/2
Once again, Scar does make some appearances in this film but does not speak. However, once again, his role remains vital, story wise. In the film, Nala, now Simba's queen, mentions Scar when she explains to Timon and Pumbaa why Simba left.

Scar makes three cameo appearances at the film's climax. The first cameo is the scene where he backs Simba up against the ledge, right when lightning strikes the base of Pride Rock; the second is during the scene where he admits to murdering Mufasa, before being pinned down by Simba; and the third is when he is defeated by Simba and kicked off the edge of Pride Rock. He survives this fall, but is attacked and killed by the hyenas that he betrayed.

Broadway musical 
The success of The Lion King spawned a Broadway musical based on the film, directed by Julie Taymor with a book written by The Lion King co-director Roger Allers and screenwriter Irene Mecchi. American actor John Vickery originated the role of Scar. In one scene in the musical, Scar, during the song "The Madness of King Scar", tries to seduce a young adult Nala and make her his queen and mother of his cubs. Nala however, rejects Scar's advances and leaves Pride Rock.

2019 CGI Animation/live action

In the photo-realistic computer animated remake, Scar is described by his voice actor Chiwetel Ejiofor as more "psychologically possessed" and "brutalized" than in the original film. Ejiofor also said that "[Scar and Mufasa's] relationship is completely destroyed and brutalized by Scar's way of thinking. He's possessed with this disease of his own ego and his own want." Among the changes, Scar is stated to have challenged Mufasa in the past and lost (it is implied he got his scar in the fight), and that both brothers courted Sarabi, who chose Mufasa. He is also not allied with the hyenas from the very beginning and has to earn their trust. During his reign, Scar takes a more active role in hunting alongside the pack of hyenas, and is also seen trying to force Sarabi, whom he still lusts for, to become his mate and queen. He restricts every conversation about his deceased brother rather than banning his name. His scar appears black instead of pink as in the original film and his general appearance is strikingly similar to that of an Asiatic lion, having a noticeably thinner mane and lighter physique.

During the climax, when he attempts to force Simba off Pride Rock, Scar makes the mistake of admitting to remember Mufasa's final moment, which exposes the truth to the lionesses, as he previously claimed that he was very late to rescue him at the gorge. As in the original film, Scar attempts to escape while the hyenas fight the lionesses, but is pursued by Simba to a ledge near the top of Pride Rock. Cornered, Scar begs for mercy and attempts to frame the hyenas for his crimes, denouncing them as "revolting scavengers", unaware that they are listening nearby. Simba refuses to believe Scar's lies, but spares his life on the condition that he leave the Pride Lands forever. Scar refuses and attacks Simba, who throws him off the cliff after a brief fight. Scar survives the fall, but is soon surrounded and attacked by the vengeful hyenas. In a minor change to the original ending, Scar initially fights back against the hyenas, but is quickly overpowered and eaten alive, ending his reign of terror for good.

The Lion Guard
Scar is portrayed in paintings throughout season 1 of The Lion Guard television series, which explains some of his backstory. When Scar was younger—as per tradition to all second born children of the current reigning "Lion King"—he led the Lion Guard who protected The Pride Lands and defended "The Circle of Life" from all enemies before his great-nephew Kion led the Guard. Like Kion, Scar was also gifted with The Roar of the Elders, which causes the lions of the Pride Lands' past to roar with the user. However, the power went to Scar's head and he vainly believed that with this power, he should be the king instead of Mufasa, but when his fellow Lion Guard members refused to aid him in his plan to dethrone Mufasa, Scar furiously destroyed them with the Roar. As a result, Scar lost the Roar forever, as it is only meant to be used for good, not evil.

Scar appears as a fiery spirit in a volcano in season 2 (voiced by David Oyelowo) starting in the one-hour long special The Rise of Scar, when Kion unknowingly summons him after using the Roar of the Elders in anger when Janja the hyena provokes him. After being summoned, Scar conspires with Janja and the other animals in the Outlands to take over the Pride Lands and defeat the new Lion Guard and Simba, who were initially unaware that Scar had returned.

Later in the season, the Lion Guard finds out that Scar has returned while they are in the Outlands getting volcanic ash needed to cure Simba from a scorpion sting. Upon returning to the Pride Lands, Kion acknowledges to his team that they have a tough fight ahead, but remains confident that they will be able to defeat Scar. Scar’s army begins sacking various locations in the Pride Lands, causing great unrest, until the Lion Guard trains the residents of the Pride Lands into a militia capable of fending off the Outlanders.

In the hour-long season 3 special Battle for the Pride Lands, Scar battles the Lion Guard, attempting to burn down Pride Rock, as well as kill Janja and his clan along with them for being tempted to defect to Jasiri’s clan. At the end of the special, Kion defeats Scar by summoning the Great Kings of the Past, to bring punishment onto Scar for his crimes, which results in his destruction, freeing the Pride Lands and the Outlands from his tyranny forever.

In flashback in Battle for the Pride Lands, it is revealed that an adolescent Scar met a rogue lion who offered his help in overthrowing Mufasa, but the rogue’s cobra companion bit Scar on the eye (leaving a scar) and poisoned him, which gradually worsened Scar's jealousy and brought out his darker instincts. Scar killed the rogue lion and his cobra, and was given the nickname “Scar” by Mufasa who was claimed to be apathetic to Scar’s plight. Scar then adopted the nickname and began plotting to personally kill his brother. This all motivates Scar to give Kion the same fate, instructing the cobra Ushari to mark Kion in the same manner; much of season 3 revolves around the results of this.

Other

A Tale of Two Brothers (book) 
Scar makes a few appearances in Six New Adventures, a book series that was sequel to the original Lion King. Most prominently, he is the antagonist in A Tale of Two Brothers. In the story, Simba breaks a promise to Kopa, his son, and Rafiki warns against this, using Scar's relationship with his own father, Ahadi, as an example why this was wrong. Feeling Mufasa is the favored child, Scar tries to make him look foolish by pitting him against a Buffalo named Boma. However, the plan fails and Scar, then named Taka, comes away with his namesake as a 'mark of shame'.

Video games 
The character appears in the 1994 video game The Lion King. According to AllGame, Scar appears towards the end of video game as Simba finally "must defeat his Uncle Scar" and "stop Scar and reclaim what is rightfully his." Scar plays a similar role in the video game The Lion King: Simba's Mighty Adventure (2000); Simba's climactic "battle with Scar concludes the first six levels of the game." According to IGN, the video game features the voices of the film's cast, including Jeremy Irons as Scar. Scar, voiced by James Horan, appears as a non-player character in Disney's Extreme Skate Adventure (2003) and Kingdom Hearts II as a villain who ultimately transforms into a Heartless as a result of the character's own "hatred and jealousy." Scar is a payable character to unlock for a limited time in Disney Magic Kingdoms.

Cameos 
Scar makes a brief cameo in Disney's animated feature film Hercules (1997) in the form of a limp lion skin coat worn by Hercules, parodying the Nemean lion. This is also likely a reference to Zazu's remark (in the first film) that Scar would "make a very handsome throw rug." Scar's supervising animator Andreas Deja also served as the supervising animator of Hercules.

Reception

Critical response 
Scar has garnered widespread acclaim from film critics, some of whom praised him as a better character than Simba. Author Peter M. Nichols wrote in his book New York Times Essential Library: Children's Movies: A Critic's Guide to the Best Films Available on Video and DVD that Scar "is the most interesting character in the film," describing Simba and Mufasa "bores in comparison." Janet Maslin of The New York Times called Scar a "delectably wicked" villain. Maslin went on to praise Irons's voice acting, writing that the actor "slithers through the story in grandiose high style, with a green-eyed malevolence that is one of film's chief delights." Leah Rozen of People described Scar as "a flawless realization of Irons's special talent." Gene Siskel of the Chicago Tribune lauded Scar as the film's "best character," jokingly describing him as "Irons' Claus von Bulow with fur." Similarly, ComingSoon.net's Joshua Starnes hailed Scar as "the best part of the film." Praising both Scar and Irons's acting, Starnes continued, "He switches so quickly and easily from campy to deadly its like a showcase for how to do an over-the-top villain right." Concluding that "Villains are often the most memorable characters in a Disney animated film," Roger Ebert described Scar "one of the great ones." James Berardinelli of ReelViews reviewed, "Gone is the buffoonery that has marked the recent trio of Ursula, Gaston, and Jafar," writing, "Scar is a sinister figure, given to acid remarks and cunning villainy." Berardinelli concluded, "The cold-hearted manner in which he causes Mufasa's death lets us know that this is not a lion to be trifled with."

A film that features the voices of several well-known A-list actors, namely Irons as Scar, Matthew Broderick as Simba, James Earl Jones as Mufasa, Nathan Lane as Timon, and Whoopi Goldberg as Shenzi, The Lion King has since gone on to be acclaimed as "one of the most impressive arrays of voice talents ever utilized in an animated film." Critics have repeatedly singled out Irons's performance, praising it extensively: Cindy White of IGN called Irons's performance "deliciously smarmy," while Andy Patrizio of IGN wrote that Irons voices Scar "in perfect Shakespearean villain mode." Rolling Stones Peter Travers hailed Irons for "deliver[ing] a triumphantly witty vocal performance that ranks with Robin Williams' in Aladdin." Peter Stack of the San Francisco Chronicle commended Disney for "nail[ing] the voice talents," specifically Irons. The Philadelphia Daily News Bill Wedo described Irons's voice as "silken," while Graham Young of the Birmingham Mail hailed the actor's performance as "magnificent." Radio Times Tom Hutchinson wrote, "Jeremy Irons [is] a vocal standout as the evil uncle Scar." Annette Basile of Filmink echoed Hutchinson's statement, writing that Scar is "voiced with relish by stand-out Jeremy Irons." The Guardians Philip French opined, "Jeremy Irons is excellent as the suavely villainous lion Scar." David Sterritt of The Christian Science Monitor exalted Irons's acting, describing him as "positively brilliant." Also hailing the film's cast as "incredible," Desson Howe of The Washington Post highlighted Irons as a "standout." Praising the film for successfully combining "grand-opera melodrama and low-comedy hi-jinks," the Orlando Sentinels Jay Boyar concluded that "One reason they work so well together is that even most of the serious sections contain an undercurrent of humor, provided ... by the deliciously droll voice-performance of Jeremy Irons as Scar." Mathew DeKinder of the St. Louis Post-Dispatch felt that Irons successfully "handle[s] all of the dramatic heavy lifting."

Even film critics who generally disliked the film tended to enjoy Scar's characterization and Irons's performance. Terrence Rafferty of The New Yorker wrote, "Among the celebrity voices on the soundtrack, two performances stand out," namely, "Jeremy Irons, as the villainous lion Scar" who "does an elegant, funny George Sanders impersonation." (Sanders himself had voiced Shere Khan for Disney in their 1967 version of The Jungle Book). Stephen Hunter of The Baltimore Sun described Irons's voice as "plummy-rich with rancid irony." Television Without Pitys Ethan Alter admitted to enjoying Scar, praising the character as "a fantastic villain and easily the most fully realized of the film's characters, thanks both to Jeremy Irons's marvelously wicked vocal performance and some clever character flourishes on behalf of the animators." David Denby of New York, who otherwise criticized the film, felt that "Irons ... sounds like he's having a better time than he's ever had in movies before." In a rare lukewarm review, Anthony Quinn of The Independent felt that Irons's performance was too campy: "more Liberace than George Sanders."

Ejiofor's characterization of Scar, while constantly compared with the original, is still generally well-received. Renaldo Matadeen from CBR Exclusives praised Scar's remake incarnation as being more frightening than the original for having more motives in his action instead of a simple jealousy and how Scar is more active in leading the hyenas. Similarly, Ejiofor's performance as Scar is also praised. Owen Gleiberman from Variety praised Ejiofor's voice acting, commenting that his Scar raises the film’s dramatic stakes, upping the ante on what Jeremy Irons did as Scar in the 1994 version. Scott Mendelson from Forbes comments that while he prefers Jeremy Irons' Scar, he still praised Ejiofor's performance for making Scar excellent and nuanced.

Accolades and legacy 
According to IGN, Scar, Simba and Mufasa have since become "household names thanks to the [film's] enormous popularity ... but back in 1994 who could have predicted that these characters would enter the lexicon of Disney's most popular creations?" Scar is considered to be among Disney's greatest villains. Desmond Ryan of The Philadelphia Inquirer reviewed Scar as "the most vivid villain in Disney features in generations." On a broader scale, Scar is often revered as one of the greatest animated villains of all-time. Entertainment Weekly included the character in the article "10 Over-the-top Animated Movie Villains", explaining, "you could only expect over-the-top when you pair such a grasping, conniving character with Jeremy Irons' seductive voice." Likewise, Digital Spys Alex Fletcher wrote of Scar in his article "Who is Disney's greatest ever villain?" that "The scene in which he lets Mufasa ... fall into a stampede of wildebeests left lasting emotional trauma on an entire generation."

The Huffington Post ranked Scar first in its "Definitive Ranking Of 25 Classic Disney Villains" countdown. Similarly, BuzzFeed also ranked Scar first in the website's "Definitive Ranking Of The Top 20 Disney Villains" list, with author Javi Moreno accusing the character of removing "the innocence of an entire generation." Scar also topped About.com's "Top 10 Disney Villains" countdown; author David Nusair concluded, "There are few figures within Disney's body of work that are as deliciously reprehensible and vile as Scar ... heightened by Jeremy Irons' gloriously smug voice work." Nusair also included Irons among the "Top 5 Celebrity Voice Performances in Animated Films", acknowledging the fact that although the actor "has played a lot of villains over the course of his career ... none have had the lasting impact as Scar from The Lion King." The Orlando Sentinel ranked Scar the sixth "greatest Disney villain of all time". Similarly, Babble.com also placed the character at number six. Included in the website's "12 most famous Disney villains from worst to best" countdown, Yahoo! Movies ranked Scar second best, while Moviefone ranked the character sixth. E! ranked Scar fifth, with author John Boone writing that the character "plotted one of the most painful deaths in Disney history, so you know he'll never be forgotten." Animation World Network ranked Scar the sixth best animated villain.

CNN considers Scar one of "Disney's scariest characters." While ranking the character fifth, The Stanford Daily wrote, "From his habit of sadistically toying with his prey to his dumb hyena coven to the way he leads the kingdom of Pride Rock into a period of starvation and sorrow, he's a backstabbing dictator of an uncle." Richard Crouse of Metro cited Scar's "Long live the King" as the character's "Most evil line." Additionally, "Be Prepared" is often revered as one of the greatest Disney villain songs. Official Disney Blogs wrote that the song, with its "hyena backup singers, and the best bone-rattling percussion of all the villains' songs," Scar proves himself "an expert crooner of villainous plots." Aside from Disney and animation, Scar is often revered as one of the greatest movie villains of all-time. Digital Spy featured the character who, according to author Simon Reynolds, "underlined the sheer blackness of his heart by ruthlessly killing Simba's father," among the "25 greatest movie villains". Similarly, in 2012, Entertainment Weekly ranked the character the twenty-fifth "Most Vile Movie Villain" ever, while Total Film ranked Scar sixty-seventh in 2014.

To-date, Deja remains best known for animating several of Disney's most famous villains, admitting to preferring animating villains over heroes. However, after The Lion King, Deja finally decided to take a break from animating villains in order to avoid repeating himself, subsequently refusing to animate villain Judge Claude Frollo in The Hunchback of Notre Dame (1996) in favor of working on Hercules from Hercules (1997), along with Mickey Mouse in the animated short Runaway Brain (1995). Comparing Scar to other villains that he has played, Irons said that he "measures very highly," having "charm," "Machiavellian qualities" and being "iconic in some of the things he says."

Criticism and controversy 
Scar became the first Disney villain to successfully explicitly murder someone. Like Disney's Bambi before it, The Lion King – dubbed the studio's "darkest" film at the time of its release – was unprecedented in terms of its serious themes, namely guilt, murder, treachery, revenge and death, specifically the on-screen assassination of one of the film's heroes. According to IGN, "The film's story concepts of morality and mortality ... was new for Disney," with The Washington Post predicting that "the death of the heroic Mufasa will be the most widely debated aspect of The Lion King, with people taking sides as to whether such things are good or bad for kids just as they did over the killing of Bambi's mother." Similarly, Variety opined, "a generation that remembers the death of Bambi's mother as traumatizing should bear that experience in mind when deciding who goes to The Lion King." Film critics and parents alike expressed concern that Scar's violent ways would frighten and disturb younger viewers. Referring to Scar murdering Mufasa, The New York Times questioned "whether this film really warranted a G rating." Critics also cautioned Scar's death; Movieline warned audiences that the film "shows a fairy tale's dark sense of justice," for example when "Scar was eaten by his hyena allies after betraying them." ReelViews James Berardinelli commented:

The Los Angeles Times warned that "The on-screen death of Mufasa and a violent battle at the finale may disturb small children," echoed by The Philadelphia Inquirer. However, film critics also felt that Disney's treatment of Scar was at times too light-hearted and comedic, with the Deseret News complaining, "a climactic battle between Simba and his evil Uncle Scar ... is [a] very bad choice near the end, as Simba and Scar battle in slow-motion, a serious moment that seems unintentionally comic." According to The Seattle Times, "Some critics have complained that the movie is too funny and good-natured to accommodate the rather grim story it's telling." Considered "an odd mix of deadly seriousness and slapstick humor ... Simba fights Scar to the death" while "intercut with ... Poomba [sic] ... doing a parody of Travis Bickel. [sic]"

Although universally acclaimed, Scar has sparked considerable controversy regarding the character's appearance and personality, specifically his darker-colored fur and alleged sexuality. The general public, however, appears to have remained largely oblivious to such concerns according to David Parkinson, author of The Rough Guide to Film Musicals. The Washington Post felt that "Scar clearly is meant to represent an evil African American because 'while Simba's mane is gloriously red, Scar's is, of course, black." Meanwhile, Scar's mannerisms and voice which, according to Nightmare on Main Street: Angels, Sadomasochism, and the Culture of Gothics author Mark Edmundson, resemble "a cultivated, world-weary, gay man," has been deemed homophobic by some commentators because, according to The Independent, "the arch-villain's gestures are effeminate" while, in addition to the film being "full of stereotypes," the character "speaks in supposed gay cliches." Susan Mackey-Kallis, author of The Hero and the Perennial Journey Home in American Film, observed that Scar is "more effeminate [and] less brawny ... than" both Mufasa and Simba. Additionally, "Even though [Scar] would be expected to mate with one of the lioness, he is never seen intimated by any." These allegations are inconsistent with the facts about real lions: dark manes indicate higher testosterone levels, and experiments show that male lions accordingly find dark-maned models more intimidating while lionesses find them more attractive. Slant Magazine defended the studio, explaining that Scar's black mane is simply an example of "the animators' elementary attempts to color-code evil for the film's target audience." Similarly, author Edward Schiappa wrote in his book Beyond Representational Correctness: Rethinking Criticism of Popular Media that Scar's voice was simply meant "to convey the sort of upper-class snobbishness evinced by George Sanders' performance as Shere Khan in The Jungle Book."

See also 
 Sissy villain

References 

The Lion King (franchise) characters
Fictional lions
Male characters in animated films
Film characters introduced in 1994
Animated characters introduced in 1994
Fictional characters with disfigurements
Fictional mass murderers
Fictional kings
Fictional dictators
Fictional fratricides
Fictional princes
Fictional regicides
Video game bosses
Demon characters in video games
Disney animated villains
Disney controversies
Male film villains
Narcissism in fiction
Film controversies
LGBT-related controversies in animation
LGBT-related controversies in film